The Girl in Room 2A (Italian: La Casa della Paura) is a 1974 giallo film directed by William Rose, starring Daniela Giordano and Angelo Infanti.

Synopsis 
Margaret Bradley is young girl just paroled from jail who rents a room in house owned by Mrs. Grant. Soon, she is being stalked by a sadistic cult led by a mysterious killer in red vestments.

Cast

 Daniela Giordano as Margaret Bradley
 Angelo Infanti as Frank Grant
 John Scanlon as Jack Whitman
 Rosalba Neri as Alicia Songbird
 Brad Harris as Charlie
 Frank Latimore as Johnson
 Giovanna Galletti as Mrs. Mary Grant
 Dada Gallotti as Claire
 Nuccia Cardinali as Mrs. Craig
 Karin Schubert as Maria
 Raf Vallone as Mr. Dresse

Reception

Donald Guarisco from Allmovie criticized the film's cinematography, "amateurish performances", "limp" pacing, and direction. Guarisco concluded his review by writing, "The Girl In Room 2A is such an uninspired proposition that even hardcore giallo fans might want to think twice about watching it." Sean Becktel from HorrorNews.net wrote, "The Girl in Room 2A seems to know exactly what it is, and to cater to  audience. It achieves a formulaic deliverance, while staying fun, enjoyable, and ultimately entertaining." Terror Trap gave the film 2.5 out of 4 stars, stating the film was "at times incomprehensible" but still great fun. Brett Gallman from Oh, the Horror valeld it "one of the more dull and dry entries of the genre".

References

External links
 
 
 
 The Girl in Room 2A at Variety Distribution

1974 films
1974 horror films
Giallo films
1970s Italian-language films
Italian horror films
1970s Italian films